Avatha chinensis is a moth of the family Erebidae first described by Warren in 1913. It is found in China and Taiwan.

References

Moths described in 1913
Avatha
Moths of Asia